Why Change Your Wife? is a 1920 American silent comedy film directed by Cecil B. DeMille and starring Gloria Swanson.

Plot
Frumpy wife Beth devotes herself to bettering her husband's mind and expanding his appreciation for the finer things in life, such as classical music. When he goes shopping at a lingerie store to buy some sexier clothes for her, he meets Sally, the shop girl. Rejected by his wife for a night out on the town, he takes Sally, who douses him with her perfume. When Beth smells another woman's perfume, she kicks him out and files for divorce.

Beth's Aunt Kate takes her shopping to get her mind off of her broken heart. While in the dress shop, Beth overhears women gossiping about how her dull appearance led to her losing her husband. She determines to "play their game" and gets a new "indecent" wardrobe. Meanwhile the manipulative Sally convinces the dejected Robert to marry her. He finds that his second wife annoys him as much as his previous one.

Later the couple and their dog end up at the same luxury hotel where divorcee Beth is strutting her stuff. She tries to seduce Robert, but he resists. Each of them quickly leaves the situation, but they meet again on a train. As they're walking away from the station, Robert slips on a banana peel. When the police arrive on the scene, Beth identifies Robert as her husband and takes him home. Doctors say he is to be kept quiet for 24 hours.

The two women argue over whether Sally will move Robert against doctor's orders. Beth locks the three of them into the bedroom, which leads to a physical struggle over the key during which Sally breaks a mirror, inviting seven years' bad luck. Beth threatens to burn Sally's face with acid, which leads to a stalemate. The three stay in the room until Robert's crisis is over. A doctor pronounces him healthy, but Robert refuses to go home with Sally. Sally throws the vial of acid on Beth's face only to discover that Beth was bluffing; the vial contained only eye wash.

Sally leaves but not before taking the cash from Robert's pants pockets and declaring that the best thing about marriage is alimony.

The final scenes show the remarried Robert and Beth in their home. Beth dresses up in more revealing clothes and replaces the classical recording on her Victrola with a record of the foxtrot. Sally has taken up with a violin player. The intertitle that ends the film reassures ladies that their husbands would prefer them as sweethearts, and reminds them to make sure they remember, from time to time, to "forget" being a wife.

Cast

 Gloria Swanson as Beth Gordon
 Thomas Meighan as Robert Gordon
 Bebe Daniels as Sally Clark
 Theodore Kosloff as Radinioff
 Sylvia Ashton as Aunt Kate
 Clarence Geldart as The Doctor
 Mayme Kelso as Harriette
 Lucien Littlefield as Butler
 Edna Mae Cooper as Maid
 Jane Wolfe as Woman Client
 William Boyd as Naval Officer at Hotel (uncredited)
 Clarence Burton as Party Guest Dozing (uncredited)
 Julia Faye as Girl in Bathing Suit (uncredited)
 Madame Sul-Te-Wan as Sally's Maid (uncredited)

Alterations
In Pennsylvania, the state film censor board made 22 cuts before the film could be passed for exhibition.

Preservation status
A 35mm print of this film exists at the George Eastman House film archive.

References

External links

1920 films
1920 comedy films
Silent American comedy films
American silent feature films
American black-and-white films
Famous Players-Lasky films
Films directed by Cecil B. DeMille
Paramount Pictures films
Surviving American silent films
Articles containing video clips
1920s American films
1920s English-language films